is a popular song composed by Ryōichi Hattori, with lyrics by Takao Saeki. It was recorded by Hideko Takamine and released in April 1949.

Background
"Ginza Kankan Musume" is the theme song of the film of the same name, released in August 1949 and starring Hideko Takamine. The song's B-side, "Waga Yume, Waga Uta", is sung by Katsuhiko Haida, who also starred in the film.

The phrase kankan musume is a play on words coined by Kajirō Yamamoto that combines can-can with pan pan musume. According to Victor Records, the song had sold 420,000 copies by 1952.

References

Japanese songs
1949 songs